Laughing Academy is the debut studio album by English band Punishment of Luxury, released in 1979 by record label United Artists.

References

External links 

 
 The Guardian article on Punishment of Luxury, mentioning the album

1979 albums
Punishment of Luxury albums